Moses Lake Airport may refer to either of two general aviation airports serving Moses Lake, Washington:
 Moses Lake Municipal Airport
 Grant County International Airport